Crime in Canada is generally considered low overall. Under the Canadian constitution, the power to establish criminal law and rules of investigation is vested in the federal Parliament. The provinces share responsibility for law enforcement (although provincial policing in many jurisdictions is contracted to the federal Royal Canadian Mounted Police), and while the power to prosecute criminal offences is assigned to the federal government, responsibility for prosecutions is delegated to the provinces for most types of criminal offences. Laws and sentencing guidelines are uniform throughout the country, but provinces vary in their level of enforcement.

According to the latest report of Statistics Canada, overall crime in Canada has been steadily declining since the late 1990s as measured by the Crime Severity Index (CSI) and the Violent Crime Severity Index (VCSI), with a more recent uptick since an all-time low in 2014. Both measures of crime saw an 8 to 10 percent decrease between 2010 and 2018. Violent crime, specifically homicide, has declined in Canada by over 40% since its peak in 1975, placing Canada 79th in the world by homicide rate—far worse than Australia, England, and Ireland, comparable to or slightly worse than Belgium, and relatively close to poorer European countries. It is tied for first in the Americas with Chile (homicide rates are 2.7 times lower than in the United States). Current crimes that are increasing include drug-related offences, fraud, sexual assault and theft, with fraud increasing 46% between 2008 and 2018.

Statistics Canada data
Crime rates in Canada were reported at 5,334 incidents per 100,000 inhabitants with violent crime at 1,098 incidents and property crime at 3,245 incidents (per 100,000).
The province or territory with the lowest crime rate in 2017 was Quebec with 3,359 incidents per 100,000 followed by Ontario with 3,804 incidents per 100,000.  The province or territory with the highest crime rate for 2017 was Nunavut with 34,948 incidents per 100,000. Overall crime decreased 23% between 2007 and 2017 with all provinces experiencing a decrease in crime (up to 34%) with the exception of Yukon which saw no decrease and Nunavut which saw an increase. Violent crime was lowest in Prince Edward Island followed by  Ontario and Quebec.    The three northern territories have higher per capita crime rates than any province.  

Canada's homicide rate per capita (per 100,000) inhabitants has been declining since a peak in the 1970s. After dropping to a low point of 1.44 homicides per 100,000 inhabitants in 2013, Canada's homicide rate has been rising again. In 2015 the rate rose to 1.68 per 100,000 people, up from 1.47 the previous year. According to Statistics Canada data from 2016, police reported 611 homicides across Canada in 2016, a rate of 1.68 per 100,000 people. Canada's national homicide rate 2017 was the highest it's been in a decade, Statistics Canada says, because of a spike in gang-related violence and shootings. The agency said there were 660 reported homicides in Canada last year. Not only was that an increase of nearly eight per cent from 2016, it also pushed up the homicide rate to 1.8 victims for every 100,000 people, the highest since 2009. The agency also said the rates of other serious offences, including attempted murder, sexual assault, robbery and aggravated assault were all up last year, as was the use of guns in violent crimes.

Police reported criminal violence is thought to be an undercount of actual violence rates.  Thus, approximately every five years, Statistics Canada conducts a survey of victimization in Canada.  The last General Social Survey conducted was in 2004, where 24,000 people were contacted by telephone: 106 reported incidents of violence per 1,000 polled, which is slightly lower than in 1999 when it was 111 per 1,000 polled.
In 2007, the number of murders dropped to 594, 12 fewer than the previous year. One-third of the 2007 murders were stabbings and another third were by firearm. In 2007, there were 190 stabbings and 188 shootings. Handguns were used in two-thirds of all firearm murders. Seventy-four youths were accused of murder, down 11 from the previous year. About eighty-four percent of murders were done by someone known to the victim. Male victims of homicide were most likely to be killed by an acquaintance, someone known to them through a criminal relationship, or a stranger. Female victims of homicide were most frequently killed by a current or former intimate partner, or another family member. The province with the highest crime rate was Manitoba while the lowest crime rates occurred in Prince Edward Island and Newfoundland and Labrador.

Police reported that the number of hate crimes in Canada dropped to 1,798 in 2018 compared to 2,073 in 2017 as per the Uniform Crime Reporting (UCR) Survey. However, the number is still higher than the previous years when there were 1,409 in 2016, 1,362 in 2015 and 1,295 in 2014. Religion continues to be the leading motivation and cause for the hate crimes (37%) in Canada according to the survey conducted by the Canadian Centre for Justice Statistics (CCJS).

Crime by region

Violent crime severity index by census metropolitan area

Crime statistics by province and territory
Crime statistics vary considerably through different parts of Canada.  In general, the eastern provinces have the lowest violent crime rates while the western provinces have higher rates and the territories higher still.  Of the provinces, Manitoba and Saskatchewan have the highest violent crime rates.  The chart below also shows that Saskatchewan has the highest provincial assault rate, and that Manitoba has the highest provincial sexual assault rate, robbery rate and homicide rate of any Canadian province. In many instances the crime rates in the Yukon, North West Territories and Nunavut are the highest in the country and can be up to ten times the national average.

2020 crime statistics for the provinces and territories are given below, as reported by Statistics Canada.

Police

In 2005, there were 61,050 police officers in Canada which equates to one police officer per 528.6 persons, but with significant regional variations. Newfoundland and Labrador and Prince Edward Island have the fewest police per capita with 664.9 and 648.4 persons per police officer, respectively. Conversely, the highest ratio of police to population is found in Canada's northern territories; Nunavut has 247.9 persons per police officer, the Northwest Territories has 248.5 persons per officer and the Yukon has 258.2 persons for each police officer.

That is a substantially lower rate than most developed countries with only Japan and Sweden having so few police officers. The United States has one officer per 411.5 persons, and Germany 344.8.

Canada's national police force is the Royal Canadian Mounted Police (RCMP) which is the main police force in Canada's north, and in rural areas except in Quebec, Ontario, and Newfoundland. Those three provinces have their own provincial police forces, although the RCMP still operate throughout rural Newfoundland and also provide specific federal policing services in Ontario and Quebec. Many cities and districts have their own municipal police forces, while others have contracts with the provincial police or RCMP to police their communities.

Report rates of crimes 
A publication posted on Statistics Canada reported that in 2009, only a small portion of crimes that happen are reported to the police (31% of all crimes), and this figure has been lowering from 1999 (37%) and 2004 (34%). Only 54% of break and enters, 43% of robberies, and 34% of assaults are reported to the police. The most common reason for not reporting a crime was the victim thought it was not important enough (68%). Other common reasons include; they think the police cannot do anything about it (59%), or they dealt with it another way (42%). Multiple reasons are given so the percentages do not sum to 100%.

Punishment

Canada abolished the death penalty for murder in 1976, instituting a mandatory sentence of life imprisonment for murder. 

In 2001, Canada had about 32,000 people in prison or about 0.13% of the total population. Globally, the United States was the country with the highest percentage of inmate population (about 0.7% of the total population). The European average is 0.2% of the total population, with France and Germany having lower rates than Canada, but with the United Kingdom, Spain and most of Eastern Europe having higher ones.

Comparisons
Comparing crime rates between countries is difficult due to the differences in jurisprudence, reporting and crime classifications.  National crime statistics are in reality statistics of only selected crime types. Data are collected through various surveying methods that have previously ranged between 15% and 100% coverage of the data.  A 2001 Statistics Canada study concluded that comparisons with the U.S. on homicide rates were the most reliable.  Comparison of rates for six lesser incident crimes was considered possible but subject to more difficulty of interpretation.  For example, types of assaults receive different classifications and laws in Canada and the U.S., making comparisons more difficult than homicides.  At the time, the U.S. crime of aggravated assault could be compared to the sum of three Canadian crimes (aggravated assault, assault with a weapon, and attempted murder). This comparison had a predicted bias that would inflate the Canadian numbers by only 0.1%.  The study also concluded that directly comparing the two countries' reported total crime rate (i.e. total selected crimes) was "inappropriate" since the totals include the problem data sets as well as the usable sets. For reasons like these, homicides have been favored in international studies looking for predictors of crime rates (predictors like economic inequality).

United States
Much study has been done of the comparative experience and policies of Canada with its southern neighbour the United States, and this is a topic of intense discussion within Canada.

Historically, the violent crime rate in Canada is far lower than that of the U.S. and this continues to be the case.  For example, in 2000 the United States' rate for robberies was 65 percent higher, its rate for aggravated assault was more than double, and its murder rate was triple that of Canada. However, the rate of some property crime types is lower in the U.S. than in Canada. For example, in 2006, the rates of vehicle theft were 22% higher in Canada than in the U.S.

Furthermore, in recent years, the gap in violent crime rates between the United States and Canada has narrowed due to a precipitous drop in the violent crime rate in the U.S.  For example, while the aggravated assault rate declined for most of the 1990s in the U.S. and was 324 per 100,000 in 2000, the aggravated assault rate in Canada remained relatively steady throughout and was 143 per 100,000 in 2000.  In other areas, the U.S. had a faster decline.  For instance, whereas the murder rate in Canada declined by 36% between 1991 and 2004, the U.S. murder rate declined by 44%.

The homicide rate in Canada peaked in 1975 at 3.03 per 100,000 and has dropped since then; it reached lower peaks in 1985 (2.72) and 1991 (2.69).  It reached a post-1970 low of 1.73 in 2003. The average murder rate between 1970 and 1976 was 2.52, between 1977 and 1983 it was 2.67, between 1984 and 1990 it was 2.41, between 1991 and 1997 it was 2.23 and between 1998 and 2004 it was 1.82.  The attempted homicide rate has fallen at a faster rate than the homicide rate.

By comparison, the homicide rate in the U.S. reached 10.1 per 100,000 in 1974, peaked in 1980 at 10.7 and reached a lower peak in 1991 (10.5).  The average murder rate between 1970 and 1976 was 9.4, between 1977 and 1983 it was 9.6, between 1984 and 1990 it was 9, between 1991 and 1997 it was 9.2 and between 1998 and 2004 it was 6.3.  In 2004, the murder rate in the U.S. dipped below 6 per 100,000, for the first time since 1966, and as of 2010 stood at 4.8 per 100,000 

In more recent years, the U.S. as a country still typically has higher violent crimes rates. In 2012, the homicide rate in the U.S. was 4.7 per 100,000 residents, Canada's was 3 times lower at 1.6. However the chances of being murdered at random are extremely low in both countries. In Canada, only 15% of murders are committed by strangers, in the U.S. this number is very similar at 14%, meaning in 50 years your chance of being murdered at random is 0.000128% in Canada, in the U.S. it is 0.000329% (of course these numbers would vary by neighborhoods within each country). Certain methods of homicide are used more frequently in each country; in Canada (0.59), stabbing homicides occur 51.3% more often than in the U.S. (0.39), however firearm homicides occur 440% more in the U.S. (2.7) than in Canada (0.5). In the U.S., you are 3 times more likely to die being shot (17.4%) than being stabbed (5.3%).

Beyond homicides, the U.S. (112.9) has a higher robbery rate - 42.2% higher than Canada (79.4). Other violent crimes such as physical assaults or sexual assaults are not very comparable between the countries because of different definitions of the crimes. The disparity in property crime is not as large, however it still exists. The burglary/break-in rate in the U.S. (670.2) is 33.1% higher than in Canada (503.7), the theft rate in the U.S. (1959.3) is 33.4% higher than in Canada (1468.4), and the auto-theft rate in the U.S. (229.7) is slightly higher than the rate in Canada (223.5).

During the first eight months of the COVID-19 pandemic, criminal incidents fell 18% in Canada. In contrast, crime has surged in the U.S., "a trend mirrored across the country." For example, in 2020 murders were up 36 percent in L.A. and nearly 45 in New York. The New York Times noted that "[e]ven smaller cities [hadn't] been spared the rise in violence: Louisville last year set a record for homicides, with 173, and [2021] is on pace to surpass that."

See also 
 Crime Stoppers
 Block Parent Program
 Gangs in Canada
 Computer crime in Canada
 Terrorism in Canada
 Department of Justice (Canada)

References

Further reading

Auger, Michel; Edwards, Peter (2004), The encyclopedia of Canadian organized crime: from Captain Kidd to Mom Boucher, Marks & Spencer 

 
 

 

 Homicide in Canada, 2018

External links
 Correctional Service Canada (commonly called Corrections Canada) administers federal prisons and parole boards.
 Crime comparisons between Canada and the United States
 Black markets in Canada